Dahan: Raakan Ka Rahasya is an Indian Hindi-language supernatural horror television series 
Directed by Vikranth Pawar, it stars Tisca Chopra,  Saurabh Shukla, Rohan Joshi, Rajesh Tailang in an ensemble cast of actors. The series premiered on Disney+Hotstar on 16 September 2022.

Cast
Tisca Chopra as Avni Raut
Saurabh Shukla as Swaroop (Pramukh Ji)
Rohan Joshi as Anay Raut
Ankur Nayyar as Sandeep
Rajesh Tailang as Parimal Singh
Mukesh Tiwari as CI Bhairon Singh
Hima Singh
Siddharth Bhardwaj
Leher Khan as Rani

References

External links
 
 Dahan on Disney+Hotstar
Hindi-language Disney+ Hotstar original programming
2022 Indian television series debuts
 Indian drama television series
 Hindi-language television shows